Marcel Charles Lapierre (b. 1907 -d.1979) was French bow maker /  Archetier who has been described as a "Maker of very fine bows much sought after by soloists."

Born 1907 in Mirecourt, served his apprenticeship in Jérôme Thibouville Lamy from 1921 to 1923. After his apprenticeship he joined Brouiller & Lotte's workshop. 
From 1931 to 1936 he worked with Francois Lotte, before joining Louis Bazin and Louis Morizot. 
In 1946 he came to Genève and joined the Pierre Vidousez's workshop. 
In 1948 he returned  to Mirecourt to start his own workshop first at rue Vuillaume and then rue Gambetta.

References 

 
 
 
 Dictionnaire Universel del Luthiers - Rene Vannes 1951,1972, 1985 (vol.3)
 Universal Dictionary of Violin & Bow Makers - William Henley 1970

1907 births
1979 deaths
Bow makers
Luthiers from Mirecourt